USCGC Daniel Tarr (WPC-1136) is the United States Coast Guard's 36th  cutter, and the first of three to be homeported in Galveston, Texas.

Design

Like her sister ships, Daniel Tarr is designed to perform search and rescue missions, port security, and the interception of smugglers.  She is armed with a remotely-controlled, gyro-stabilized 25 mm autocannon, four crew served M2 Browning machine guns, and light arms. She is equipped with a stern launching ramp, that allows her to launch or retrieve a water-jet propelled high-speed auxiliary boat, without first coming to a stop.  Her high-speed boat has over-the-horizon capability, and is useful for inspecting other vessels, and deploying boarding parties.

The crew's drinking water needs are met through a desalination unit.  The crew mess is equipped with a television with satellite reception.

Operational career

Daniel Tarr was delivered to the Coast Guard, in Key West, on November 7, 2019, and she was commissioned on January 10, 2020. on her first patrol she successfully interdicted 5 illegal Mexican launcha fishing vessels along with hundreds of feet of fishing line.

Namesake

In 2010, Master Chief Petty Officer of the Coast Guard  Charles "Skip" W. Bowen, who was then the United States Coast Guard's most senior non-commissioned officer, proposed that all 58 cutters in the Sentinel class should be named after enlisted sailors in the Coast Guard, or one of its precursor services, who were recognized for their heroism.  The Coast Guard chose Daniel Tarr as the namesake of the 36th cutter.  Tarr, and three other Coast Guard sailors, piloted the first landing craft during the United States first amphibious landing, in the Pacific Theater, during World War II.  Tarr, and his three colleagues were each awarded a Silver Star medal for this task. His colleagues Harold Miller and Glen Harris have Sentinel-class cutters named after them, as will his other colleague William Sparling.

References

External links
 

Sentinel-class cutters
2019 ships
Ships of the United States Coast Guard
Ships built in Lockport, Louisiana